Park Lane was the world's first goods terminus on the Liverpool and Manchester Railway serving the south end Liverpool Docks. The station was opened in 1830. Its initial name was Wapping Station.

The goods station suffered from heavy German air raids during the Second World War, being mostly rebuilt after the conflict. The station along with the Wapping Tunnel was closed in 1972 and subsequently demolished. The tunnel remains intact.

Future proposals
The Kings Dock Arena is opposite the Wapping Tunnel's portal. There have been many calls to reuse the long tunnel giving a station serving the Kings Dock Arena and immediate docks on the old goods station site.

In August 2009, the Liverpool Daily Post reported that a new Merseyrail Light-rail tram-train link from Edge Hill in the east of the city to the Arena at Kings Dock near the city centre was being considered. The Wapping Tunnel links the two locations.

References

Disused railway goods stations in Great Britain
Disused railway stations in Liverpool
Former London and North Western Railway stations
Railway stations in Great Britain opened in 1830
Railway stations in Great Britain closed in 1972
1830 establishments in England